Petra Martić was the defending champion, but she chose not to participate as she was still competing at the 2020 US Open.

Patricia Maria Țig won her maiden WTA tour-level singles title, defeating Eugenie Bouchard in the final, 2–6, 6–1, 7–6(7–4).

Seeds

Draw

Finals

Top half

Bottom half

Qualifying

Seeds

Qualifiers

Draw

First qualifier

Second qualifier

Third qualifier

Fourth qualifier

References

External Links
 Main Draw
 Qualifying Draw

İstanbul Cup
2020 in Turkish tennis
Istanbul Cup - Singles
2020 in Istanbul